AEW Double or Nothing is a professional wrestling pay-per-view (PPV) event produced by All Elite Wrestling (AEW). Established in 2019, it is held annually during Memorial Day weekend. The inaugural Double or Nothing was also the very first PPV as well as the very first event produced by AEW and is thus considered the promotion's marquee event. It is also considered one of the "Big Four" PPVs for AEW, along with All Out, Full Gear, and Revolution, the company's four biggest shows produced quarterly.

The name Double or Nothing was originally referenced in a promo that Cody Rhodes made immediately after the September 2018 All In event, which was an independently produced PPV that came as a result of a bet with wrestling journalist Dave Meltzer. Rhodes, a key figure behind All In who would become a co-founder and wrestler for AEW from 2019 to 2022, said "I know when you make a bet, sometimes you go double or nothing"—AEW was then founded in January 2019 with Double or Nothing as its first event that May. The name is also a reference to its Las Vegas theme, with the event traditionally held at arenas on the Las Vegas Strip in Paradise, Nevada. The only exceptions to this were the 2020 and 2021 events, which were originally scheduled for Vegas but had to be held at Daily's Place in Jacksonville, Florida due to the COVID-19 pandemic—after Florida loosened its COVID-19 protocols, the 2021 event was AEW's first PPV to have a full capacity crowd, as well as the final PPV held at Daily's Place before AEW resumed live touring in July that year.

Since the 2020 event, Double or Nothing has featured a specialized tornado tag team match between two five-man teams. For 2020 and 2021, this was the Stadium Stampede match. To capitalize on the rise of cinematic matches during the pandemic, both year's events were headlined by the Stadium Stampede match, which was contested in both Daily's Place and the adjacent TIAA Bank Field stadium. With the return to Las Vegas for the 2022 event, Stadium Stampede was replaced by Anarchy in the Arena with the wrestlers fighting all throughout the T-Mobile Arena.

History
After the success of the September 2018 All In event, an independent wrestling event that came as a result of a bet with wrestling journalist Dave Meltzer, a group known as The Elite (Cody, The Young Bucks, and Kenny Omega), the driving forces behind the event, used the positive response from All In to pursue further events with backing of businessmen Shahid Khan and Tony Khan. In a promo after All In, Cody said "I know when you make a bet, sometimes you go double or nothing". On November 5, 2018, several trademarks were filed in Jacksonville, Florida, among them were "All Elite Wrestling" and "Double or Nothing", leading to speculation of the formation of a promotion and the name of the promotion's first event.

On January 1, 2019, All Elite Wrestling (AEW) was officially founded. Along with the announcement, the promotion's inaugural event, Double or Nothing, was scheduled to air on pay-per-view (PPV) during Memorial Day weekend on May 25, 2019, at the MGM Grand Garden Arena on the Las Vegas Strip in Paradise, Nevada, with the event taking on a Las Vegas theme. Double or Nothing would become considered AEW's marquee event, with AEW president Tony Khan later referring to the event as being one of the promotion's "big four" PPVs, their four biggest shows of the year produced quarterly, along with All Out, Full Gear, and Revolution.

While AEW had planned to again host the 2020 event at the same location on May 23 that year, the venue canceled all events up through May 31 due to the COVID-19 pandemic. In response, the promotion announced that the 2020 event would still proceed as planned (which occurred at Daily's Place and the TIAA Bank Field stadium in Jacksonville, Florida), while also confirming that a third Double or Nothing would emanate from the MGM Grand Garden Arena on May 29, 2021. In addition to offering refunds, tickets purchased for 2020's show would be valid for the 2021 event. However, due to the ongoing pandemic, the 2021 event was also moved to Daily's Place and was moved back a day to May 30; as a result, the MGM Grand Garden Arena issued refunds for all originally purchased tickets. AEW resumed live touring in July, thus the 2021 Double or Nothing was the promotion's final PPV held at Daily's Place during the pandemic. It was also the company's first show to run at full venue capacity during the pandemic after Florida loosened its COVID-19 protocols.

In December 2021, it was confirmed that the 2022 Double or Nothing would return the event to Las Vegas. It was also announced that the event would host the finals of the inaugural Owen Hart Cup. On February 23, 2022, the date was confirmed for May 29 at the T-Mobile Arena. The 2023 event was also confirmed to be held at the same arena on May 28 that year.

Events

See also 
List of All Elite Wrestling pay-per-view events

References

External links 
All Elite Wrestling Official website

 
Recurring events established in 2019